The Middleburg Virginia AVA is an American Viticultural Area in the northern Piedmont region of Virginia,  west of Washington, D.C.  It is named for the town of Middleburg, Virginia and is bounded by the Potomac River to the north and by mountains in other directions. The hardiness zone of the AVA is 7a.

History
In 1972, owners of Meredyth Vineyards in Middleburg planted 2,300 vines. The number of vineyards grew over the years until Rachel Martin, Executive Vice President of Boxwood Winery solely petitioned the Tobacco Tax and Trade Bureau to establish the AVA.

References

External links
Central Virginia Region from the official guide to Virginia wineries.

Geography of Loudoun County, Virginia
American Viticultural Areas
Virginia wine
1984 establishments in Virginia